Rearsby railway station was a former station serving the villages of Rearsby and Thrussington in Leicestershire. The station was situated at a level crossing on the road between the two.

History
The station opened in 1846 on the Syston and Peterborough Railway. The station building were designed by the architects William Parsons and Sancton Wood. The contractors Norman and Grimson undertook to build it for £744 8s 6d. and it was remarkably similar to the station at Asfordby.

It closed in 1951.

Stationmasters

Thomas Sharp ca. 1849 - 1889
William Sugars 1889 - 1895 (afterwards station master at Tibshelf)
A.W. Kingdom 1895 - 1897 (formerly station master at Little Eaton)
John Lewis Shannon 1897 - 1900 (afterwards station master at Ashwell, Kegworth, assistant station master at Derby, then station master at Nottingham, Sheffield and finally London St Pancras)
Frederick H. Shelton 1900 - ca. 1911
M. Shilion ca. 1914
J.H. Roberts ca. 1928 (also station master at Brooksby)
Luke Randolph Benson ca. 1933 - 1942 (also station master at Brooksby)

References

Disused railway stations in Leicestershire
Former Midland Railway stations
Railway stations in Great Britain opened in 1846
Railway stations in Great Britain closed in 1951
1846 establishments in England